The 2010 Korea Open was a women's tennis tournament played on outdoor hard courts. It was the 7th edition of the Korea Open, and was part of the WTA International tournaments of the 2010 WTA Tour. It took place at the Seoul Olympic Park Tennis Center in Seoul, South Korea, from September 20 through September 26, 2010.

Entrants

 1 Seeds are based on the rankings of 13 September, but are subjected to change.

Other entrants
The following players received wildcards into the singles main draw:
  Ana Ivanovic
  Kim So-jung
  Dinara Safina

The following players received entry from the qualifying draw:
  Simona Halep
  Hsieh Su-wei
  Bojana Jovanovski
  Junri Namigata

Finals

Singles

 Alisa Kleybanova defeated  Klára Zakopalová, 6–1, 6–3
 It was Kleybanova's second title this year and in her career.

Doubles

 Julia Görges /  Polona Hercog defeated  Natalie Grandin /  Vladimíra Uhlířová, 6–3, 6–4

External links
 Official website
 Singles, Doubles, and Qualifying Singles draws

Korea Open
2010
September 2010 sports events in South Korea
Korea